The 2019 Ford EcoBoost 300 is a NASCAR Xfinity Series race held on November 16, 2019, at Homestead-Miami Speedway in Homestead, Florida. Contested over 200 laps on the 1.5 mile (2.4 km) oval, it was the 33rd and final race of the 2019 NASCAR Xfinity Series season.

Background

Track

Homestead-Miami Speedway is a motor racing track located in Homestead, Florida. The track, which has several configurations, has promoted several series of racing, including NASCAR, the Verizon IndyCar Series, the Grand-Am Rolex Sports Car Series and the Championship Cup Series.

Since 2002, Homestead-Miami Speedway has hosted the final race of the season in all three of NASCAR's series: the Sprint Cup Series, Xfinity Series and Gander Outdoors Truck Series. Ford Motor Company sponsors all three of the season-ending races; the races have the names Ford EcoBoost 400, Ford EcoBoost 300 and Ford EcoBoost 200, respectively, and the weekend is marketed as Ford Championship Weekend. The Xfinity Series (then known as the Busch Series) has held its season-ending races at Homestead since 1995.

Entry list

Practice

Qualifying

Qualifying results

. – Playoffs driver

Race

Summary
Tyler Reddick started on pole, and was challenging by Cole Custer in the opening laps. On lap 32, a caution was thrown for debris being stuck in the wall, causing Reddick and Custer to pit while Christopher Bell and Justin Allgaier stayed out. Custer managed to charge back to the front, only finishing behind teammate Chase Briscoe in Stage 1.

On lap 59, Custer made a pit stop for a loose wheel, causing him to go down one lap. He managed to weave past Austin Cindric and restarted in the final stage on the lead lap.

In the closing laps, Custer caught up to Reddick and took the lead. Reddick slid past Custer with under 20 laps remaining and pulled away, winning the race and the championship.

Stage Results

Stage One
Laps: 45

Stage Two
Laps: 45

Final Stage Results

Stage Three
Laps: 110

. – Driver won the championship

. – Playoffs driver

References

Ford EcoBoost 300
Ford EcoBoost 300
NASCAR races at Homestead-Miami Speedway
2019 NASCAR Xfinity Series